Bamse and the Witch's Daughter is a 2016 Swedish-language animated film directed by Christian Ryltenius and Maria Blom from a screenplay by Ida Kjellin and Sofie Forsman, based on the Bamse cartoon franchise by Rune Andréasson. A sequel to Bamse and the Thief City (2014), it is the second film in the Bamse film series, and was followed by Bamse And The Thunder Clock (2018 film) (2018). An international co-production between Sweden, Hungary, Germany and Taiwan, the film was produced by SF Studios and Tre Vänner, and distributed by Nordic Film. It was released on 25 December 2016, and received generally positive reviews from critics, who praised for its animation, character development and anti-capitalist messages, however criticised its screenplay.

Cast 
Peter Haber as Bamse
Steve Kratz as Skalman
Morgan Alling as Little Shot
Jonas Karlsson as Krösus Sork
Ingela Olsson as Hatiora the Witch
Laura Jonstoij Berg as Lova
Tea Stjärne as Nalle-Maja
Malin Cederbladh as Hugg
Christer Fant as Tagg
Shebly Niavarani as the Wolf
Leif Andrée as Knocke and Smocke
Ia Langhammer as the Grandmother
Maria Bolme as Brummelisa
Karin Gidfors as Miss Fiffi
Andreas Rothlin Svensson as Tough Sork
Emma Peters as Tessan Sork

References

External links 
 (in Swedish)

Bamse and the Witch's Daughter at the Swedish Film Database (in Swedish)

2016 animated films
2016 films
Swedish children's films
Swedish animated films
Films based on Swedish comics
Animated films based on comics
Tre Vänner films
2010s Swedish films